Bruce County was one of the counties of New Zealand in the South Island. The county's headquarters were in Milton. Its first meeting was on 4 January 1877 at the Milton court house. Clutha District Council began in November 1989 with amalgamation of Balclutha Borough, Clutha County, Lawrence Borough, Tapanui Borough, part of Tuapeka County and Bruce District Council. Bruce District Council had been formed in 1986 from Bruce County, Milton Borough and Kaitangata Borough.

See also 
 List of former territorial authorities in New Zealand § Counties

References

External links 

 1915 map
 1956 photo of councillors outside the Union

Coordinates on Wikidata
Counties of New Zealand
Politics of Otago